Ion G. Sbiera (born November 1, 1835, in Horodnic de Jos - died October 22, 1916, in Czernowitz) was a Romanian folklorist.  He was one of the founding members of the Romanian Academy.

1836 births
1916 deaths
People from Suceava County
Romanian Austro-Hungarians
Romanian folklorists
Founding members of the Romanian Academy
Academic staff of Chernivtsi University